The Elk River is a river in the U.S. state of California, originating at  elevation in forested highlands southeast of Eureka, California. The north and south forks combine to flow  into Humboldt Bay on the south edge of Eureka. The river was called Ka-sha-reh by the Wiyot people, but received its present name after Josiah Gregg's party enjoyed a meal of elk meat near the river on Christmas, 1849.

In 2014, the North Coast Regional Water Quality Control Board recommended that the Elk River be listed as an impaired waterway because of E. coli contamination 600 times greater than normal.

References

Eureka, California
Rivers of Humboldt County, California
Rivers of Northern California